Margot Gudrun Moe (3 March 1899 in Oslo – 12 March 1988 in Oslo) was a Norwegian figure skater. She competed at the 1920 Summer Olympics in Antwerp where she placed fifth, and won a bronze medal at the 1922 World Figure Skating Championships.

Results

References

External links

Navigation

1899 births
1988 deaths
Sportspeople from Oslo
Norwegian female single skaters
Olympic figure skaters of Norway
World Figure Skating Championships medalists
Figure skaters at the 1920 Summer Olympics
20th-century Norwegian women